Hidayat Manaö (born 1 January 1961) is an Indonesian military officer from the legal corps who has served as the Associate Justice of the Supreme Court of Indonesia since 7 November 2017.

References 

1961 births
Living people
Indonesian generals
Justices of the Supreme Court of Indonesia